The Octagon Round Barn, Indian Creek Township is a historic building located near Iowa Center in rural Story County, Iowa, United States. It was built in around 1880 as a dairy barn.  The octagon-shaped building measures  in diameter. The modified hip roof, heavy timber framing, rectangular interior plan, and general purpose use marks this as a design influenced by Lorenzo S. Coffin, who built the first round barn in Iowa. It has been listed on the National Register of Historic Places since 1986. The barn has deteriorated significantly and it is essentially a pile of wood now.

References

Infrastructure completed in 1880
Buildings and structures in Story County, Iowa
Barns on the National Register of Historic Places in Iowa
National Register of Historic Places in Story County, Iowa
Round barns in Iowa